Events in the year 1604 in Norway.

Incumbents
Monarch: Christian IV

Events
4 December:
 Christian IV’s Norwegian Law of 1604 is issued, essentially as a translation into Danish of the older Norwegian law of Magnus law-mender established and recorded in Norwegian in 1274 and 1276.
 Hiring anyone who had attended Jesuit schools in positions in schools and churches was made illegal.

Arts and literature

Births
 Niels Hanssøn Meng, timber trader and Mayor (died 1676).

Deaths

17 April – Rasmus Hjort, priest, humanist, educator (born c.1525).

See also

References